Malinovka is a rural locality (a village) and the administrative centre of Malinovsky Selsoviet, Belebeyevsky District, Bashkortostan, Russia. The population was 440 as of 2010. There are 9 streets.

Geography 
Malinovka is located 15 km south of Belebey (the district's administrative centre) by road. Skobelevka is the nearest rural locality.

References 

Rural localities in Belebeyevsky District